The following is a list of commencement speeches given by Sister Helen Prejean.

References

Cultural lists
Speeches by type